Marshall Hall Jr. (17 September 1910 – 4 July 1990) was an American mathematician who made significant contributions to group theory and combinatorics.

Career 
Hall studied mathematics at Yale University, graduating in 1932.  He studied for a year at Cambridge University under a Henry Fellowship working with G. H. Hardy. He returned to Yale to take his Ph.D. in 1936 under the supervision of Øystein Ore.

He worked in Naval Intelligence during World War II, including six months in 1944 at Bletchley Park, the center of British wartime code breaking. In 1946 he took a position at Ohio State University. In 1959 he moved to the California Institute of Technology where, in 1973, he was named the first IBM Professor at Caltech, the first named chair in mathematics. After retiring from Caltech in 1981, he accepted a post at Emory University in 1985.

Hall died in 1990 in London on his way to a conference to mark his 80th birthday.

Contributions 
He wrote a number of papers of fundamental importance in group theory, including his solution of Burnside's problem for groups of exponent 6, showing that a finitely generated group in which the order of every element divides 6 must be finite.

His work in combinatorics includes an important paper of 1943 on projective planes, which for many years was one of the most cited mathematics research papers. In this paper he constructed a family of non-Desarguesian planes which are known today as Hall planes. He also worked on block designs and coding theory.

His classic book on group theory was well received when it came out and is still useful today. His book Combinatorial Theory came out in a second edition in 1986, published by John Wiley & Sons.

He proposed Hall's conjecture on the differences between perfect squares and perfect cubes, which remains an open problem as of 2015.

Publications
 1943: "Projective Planes", Transactions of the American Mathematical Society 54(2): 229–77 
 1959: The Theory of Groups, Macmillan 
 Wilhelm Magnus (1960) Review: Marshall Hall, Jr. Theory of Groups Bulletin of the American Mathematical Society 66(3): 144–6. 
 1964: (with James K. Senior) The Groups of Order 2n n ≤ 6), Macmillan 
 Preface: "An exhaustive catalog of the 340 groups of order dividing 64 with detailed tables of defining relations, constants, and lattice presentations of each group in the notation the text defines. "Of enduring value to those interested in finite groups".
 1967: Combinatorial Theory, Blaisdell

Notes

References

External links
 
 

1910 births
1990 deaths
20th-century American mathematicians
Mathematicians from Missouri
Scientists from St. Louis
Algebraists
Group theorists
Emory University faculty
Combinatorialists
California Institute of Technology faculty
Ohio State University faculty
Yale Graduate School of Arts and Sciences alumni
Yale College alumni